The Gordon E. Pape House, also known as Sunny Knolls, is a historic building in Indian Hill, Ohio. It was listed in the National Register of Historic Places on June 9, 2006.

The Gordon E. Pape House is one of five sites in Indian Hill that is listed on the National Register, along with the Elliott House, the Jefferson Schoolhouse, the Methodist church, and the Washington Heights School.

Notes

External links
Documentation from the University of Cincinnati

Houses on the National Register of Historic Places in Ohio
Indian Hill, Ohio
Houses in Hamilton County, Ohio
National Register of Historic Places in Hamilton County, Ohio